Planet is the twentieth studio album by American hip hop recording artist Tech N9ne. It was released on March 2, 2018, via Strange Music. The album features guest appearances from Jordan Omley, Krizz Kaliko, Navé Monjo, Machine Gun Kelly, Mackenzie Nicole and Snow Tha Product, among others.

Track listing

Charts

References

External links

2018 albums
Tech N9ne albums
Strange Music albums
Albums produced by Mr. Porter
Albums produced by Seven (record producer)